This is a list of Kentucky Confederate Civil War Confederate units. The list of Kentucky Union Civil War units is shown separately.

Infantry

 1st Infantry Regiment
 2nd Infantry Regiment
 3rd Infantry Regiment
 4th Infantry Regiment
 5th Infantry Regiment
 6th Infantry Regiment
 7th Infantry Regiment
 8th Infantry Regiment
 9th Infantry Regiment (Hunt's 5th Infantry Regiment)
 1st (Taylor's) Infantry Battalion
 Duncan's (Desha's) Infantry Battalion
 Ficklin's Battalion, Infantry
 Kirkpatrick's Battalion
 White's Infantry Battalion
 Corbin's (Captain) Men

Cavalry

 1st Cavalry Regiment (1st (3rd) Cavalry)
 2nd (Duke's) Cavalry Regiment
 2nd (Woodward's) Cavalry Regiment
 3rd (Butler's) Cavalry Regiment
 3rd (Tucker's) Cavalry Regiment
 3rd & 7th (Consolidated) Cavalry
 4th Cavalry Regiment
 5th Cavalry Regiment
 6th Cavalry Regiment
 7th Cavalry Regiment ("3rd Cavalry Regiment")
 8th Cavalry Regiment
 8th and 12th (Consolidated) Cavalry
 9th Cavalry Regiment ("4th Mounted Rifles Regiment")
 10th Cavalry Regiment, Partisan ("10th Cavalry Regiment")
 10th (Diamond's) Cavalry Regiment
 10th (Johnson's) Cavalry Regiment
 10th Cavalry Regiment
 11th Cavalry Regiment ("7th (Chenault's) Cavalry Regiment")
 11th (Hollis') Cavalry Regiment
 12th Cavalry Regiment ("1st Kentucky and Tennessee Mounted Rifles")
 13th Cavalry Regiment ("10th Mounted Rifles," "10th Infantry Regiment," "10th Cavalry Battalion," "10th Mounted Rifles," "11th Mounted Rifles," or "11th Mounted Infantry Regiment")
 13th (Sypert's) Cavalry Regiment
 14th Cavalry Regiment ("10th (May's) Cavalry Regiment")
 14th (Richard C. Morgan's) Cavalry Regiment
 15th Cavalry Regiment ("2nd (Woodward's) Cavalry Regiment")
 16th (Chenowith's) Cavalry Regiment
 1st Cavalry Battalion
 1st (King's) Cavalry Battalion
 1st Special Cavalry Battalion
 2nd Cavalry Battalion
 2nd Special Cavalry Battalion
 3rd Cavalry Battalion - failed to complete organization
 3rd Special Cavalry Battalion
 4th Special Cavalry Battalion
 9th (Breckinridge's) Cavalry Battalion
 Stoner's Cavalry Battalion
 Buckner Guards, Cavalry
 Morgan's Cavalry Squadron
 Bolen's (Captain) Independent Company, Cavalry
 Dudley's (Captain) Independent Cavalry
 Jenkins' (Captain) Company, Cavalry

Mounted Rifles
 1st Cavalry Battalion, Mounted Rifles
 2nd Cavalry Battalion, Mounted Rifles
 2nd Cavalry, Mounted Infantry
 3rd Cavalry Battalion, Mounted Rifles ("1st Kentucky Mounted Rifles")
 3rd Cavalry Battalion, Mounted Rifles ("Jessee's")
 Caudill's Army
 May's Cavalry Battalion, Mounted Rifles
 Morris' Cavalry Regiment, Mounted Rifles

Mounted Infantry
 3rd Mounted Infantry
 4th Mounted Infantry
 5th Mounted Infantry
 6th Mounted Infantry
 7th Mounted Infantry
 8th Mounted Infantry
 9th Mounted Infantry

Partisan Rangers
 Morehead's Regiment (Partisan Rangers)
 Patton's Cavalry Battalion, Partisan Rangers
 Field's (Captain) Company (Partisan Rangers)
 Rowan's (Captain) Company (Partisan Rangers)

Artillery

Horse Artillery
Byrne's (Captain) Company, Horse Artillery

Artillery
 1st Kentucky Artillery (Lyon's Artillery Battery or Cobb's Artillery Battery)
 Bell's Artillery Battery
 Byrne's Artillery Battery
 Cumberland Artillery Battery (Cpt Henry D. Green later Cpt. W. H. Hedden)
 Graves' Battery
 Harris'-Arnett's-Corbett's Artillery Battery
 Issaquena Artillery Battery
 Williams' Artillery Battery

Brigades
 First Kentucky Brigade (Orphan Brigade)

See also

 Lists of American Civil War Regiments by State
 Confederate Units by State

 
Kentucky
Civil War